Eka Lagnachi Dusri Goshta  was the Indian Marathi language TV serial aired on Zee Marathi from 16 January 2012 to 25 August 2012. The show starred Mukta Barve and Swapnil Joshi in lead roles. Its franchise Eka Lagnachi Teesri Goshta starring Spruha Joshi and Umesh Kamat began airing in 2013. The series premiered from Monday to Saturday at 8.30 pm by replacing Guntata Hriday He.

Plot
The show is the story of a boy and a girl with a very different approach towards their life and career. The boy, Ghanashyam Kale has an American Dream, and desperately wants to shift in USA. The girl, Radha Desai, is working in an advertising agency and living with her father. Radha's father is a single parent.

Radha and Ghana have their individual goals in their lives and don't want to be married. But both Kale and Desai families put pressure on them to get married as soon as possible because of their age. Both families arrange dates for them many times but every time Radha and Ghana refuse to get married. Radha has rejected 71 boys and Ghana has rejected 63 girls before they meet each other. Due to relentless pressure from their families Radha and Ghana take an unusual decision of Contract Marriage.

Radha and Ghana reluctantly marry with the agreement that they will divorce each other over a year. Radha is initially uncomfortable living with a joint family, but gets accustomed to it soon. The serial chronicles the couple's attempts to hide their true decision from their family. In an unusual turn of events, Radha and Ghana develop feelings for one other. Soon many people from the house come to know about their contract marriage. Ghana's grandmother also learns of their intentions and introduces a new boy, Abhir, in their lives.

Ghanashyam's attempts to get into the US fail despite his efforts. Abhir falls for Radha, but she in turn longs for her husband. Abhir leaves, and Radha confesses her love for Ghanashyam, and tells him that she doesn't want a divorce. The latter spurns her and reminds her of her contract. It is revealed that Ghana had unrequited love for his deceased childhood friend and wants to go to the US for her sake.

Towards the end, Ghanashyam nearly succeeds in getting into America, but is rejected because he is married. He is upset thinking is marriage is coming in between his dreams. Ghanashyam tells his boss that he is getting divorced, but realizes that he was hurting his family for his own personal gain. He realizes that he has grown to love his wife and doesn't want to divorce her or leave her. He realises that he loves his wife and family much more than his American Dream.

Ghanashyam rejects the offer of going to America and decides to resign. But his boss is impressed with Ghanashyam and hence offers him the same package in India. Ghanashyam reconciles and apologizes to his wife and family. He proposes to his wife as he is really in love now. The serial ends with the couple going to their honeymoon abroad.

Cast

Main
 Mukta Barve as Radha Mahesh Desai / Radha Ghanashyam Kale
 Swapnil Joshi as Ghanashyam Kale (Ghana)

Recurring
 Umesh Kamat as Abir Ranade, Paying guest at Desai family
 Vinay Apte as Mahesh Desai, Radha's father
 Sukanya Kulkarni as Prachi Atya, Mahesh's sister
 Mohan Joshi as Shripad Kale
 Vivek Lagu replaced Mohan as Shripad Kale
 Rekha Kamat as Ghana's grandmother (Mai)
 Satish Tare as Mauli, Kale Family's Servant
Akshata Bhole as Pari, Grandmother's Care Taker
 Rishikesh Joshi as Avinash Sonawane, Radha's boss 
 Shridhar Limaye as Angad Kashyap, Ghana's boss
 Ila Bhate as Devaki Kale, Ghana's mother
 Milind Phatak as Vallabh Kale, Ghana's uncle
 Manjusha Godse as Vallari, Vallabh's wife 
 Spruha Joshi as Kuhu, Vallabh and Vallari's daughter
 Shrikar Pitre as Prabhat, Kuhu's love interest
 Mohit Gokhale as Dnyanesh (Dnyana), Vallabh and Vallari's son 
 Sunil Abhyankar as Digambar Kale (Digya), Ghana's uncle
 Leena Bhagwat as Supriya Kale, Digambar's wife
 Parharsh Naik as Ganga Kale, Digambar and Supriya's son
 Asawari Joshi as Ulka
 Sandeep Pathak as Manav Gokhale, Radha's colleague
 Prajakta Hanamghar as Sonia, Radha's colleague
 Girish Joshi as Vinod Kaka, Ulka's ex-husband
 Samir Choughule as Sameer, Ghana's colleague friend
 Manva Naik as Sumukhi, Supriya Kale's Niece

Reception
Zee Marathi converted the series into a mini film and aired it on 20 January 2013 in memory of the show, the mini film was known as ELDG-Cinematic.

Adaptations

References

External links
 
 
 Eka Lagnachi Dusri Goshta at ZEE5

Marathi-language television shows
2012 Indian television series debuts
2012 Indian television series endings
Zee Marathi original programming